OGK-3 (meaning: The Third Generation Company of the Wholesale Electricity Market – WGC-3) was a Russian power company.  The stock was traded on the MICEX-RTS stock exchange.

History
OGK-3 was formed in 2004 by merger of six electricity generation companies as a part of restructuring of RAO UES, Russian state-controlled energy holding company.  In 2007, after emission of its new shares, Norilsk Nickel became the largest shareholder in the company.

In 2008, OGK-3 acquired 24.99% in Rusia Petroleum, an operator of the Kovykta gas field.  However, in 2010 Rusia Petroleum went bankruptcy.

In December 2010, it was announced that Inter RAO will acquire Norilsk Nickel's stake in OGK-3 increasing its stake in the company up to 85%. In 2012, OGK was merged into Inter RAO.

Operations
OGK-3 owned following power stations:

Kostroma SDPP – 3,600 MW
Pechora SDPP – 1,060 MW
Cherepetsk SDPP – 1,425 MW
Kharanorsk SDPP – 430 MW
Gusinoozersk SDPP – 1,100 MW
Yuznouralsk SDPP – 882 MW.

The company's registered office is in Ulan Ude in Buryatia, the headquarters are located in Moscow.

References

External links
 OGK-3  English language web-site

Companies based in Ulan-Ude
Energy companies established in 2004
Energy companies disestablished in 2012
Inter RAO
Defunct electric power companies of Russia